Yuanmoupithecus is an extinct genus of gibbons that lived 8.2 to 7.1 million years ago during the late Miocene. It is currently the oldest gibbon known. It was discovered in Yuanmou, Yunnan Province, China. The type species is Y. xiaoyuan.

References 

Miocene primates of Asia
Fossil taxa described in 2006
Gibbons
Miocene primates